Ed Conroy may refer to:

Ed Conroy (basketball) (born 1967), American college basketball coach
Ed Conroy (politician) (1946 – 2020), Canadian politician

See also
Edward Conroy (disambiguation)
Conroy (disambiguation)